Yvon Coussin (30 April 1950 – 4 December 2009) was a French weightlifter. He competed in the men's middle heavyweight event at the 1976 Summer Olympics.

References

1950 births
2009 deaths
French male weightlifters
Olympic weightlifters of France
Weightlifters at the 1976 Summer Olympics
Sportspeople from Vaucluse